The relic of the tooth of Buddha (Pali danta dhātuya) is venerated in Sri Lanka as a sacred cetiya relic of Lord Buddha, who is the founder of Buddhism, the fourth largest religion worldwide.

History

The relic in India
According to Sri Lankan legends, when the Buddha died in 543 BC, his body was cremated in a sandalwood pyre at Kushinagar and his left canine tooth was retrieved from the funeral pyre by his disciple, Khema. Khema then gave it to King Brahmadatte for veneration. It became a royal possession in Brahmadatte's country and was kept in the city of Dantapuri (modern Puri, Odisha).

A belief grew that whoever possessed the tooth relic had a divine right to rule that land. The Dāṭhāvaṃsa recounts the tale of a war fought over the relic 800 years later between Guhasiva of the republic of Kalinga and a king named Pandu.

The relic in Sri Lanka 

Legend states the Abhayagiri vihāra was first appointed custodianship of the relic when it was brought to the island after the conflict in Kalinga. As time went on, the land was threatened with foreign invasions; at one time, King Bayinnaung of Toungoo dynasty in Burma had offered the Portuguese invaders £50,000 as ransom to save the sacred tooth; and the seat of the kingdom was moved from Anuradhapura to Polonnaruwa, then to Dambadeniya and other cities. Upon each change of capital, a new palace was built to enshrine the relic.  Finally, it was brought to Kandy where it is at present, in the Temple of the Tooth. The scholar Charles Boxer, however, claimed that the tooth was "publicly pounded to smithereens with a mortar and pestle by the Archbishop of Goa" as one of the results of the Church's attempt to eradicate native religions [no date given but inferred 1550s or so].

The relic came to be regarded as a symbolic representation of the Buddha and it is on this basis that there grew up a series of offerings, rituals, and ceremonies. These are conducted under the supervision of the two Mahanayakas of Malwatte, Asgiriya chapters, and Diyawadana Nilame of the Maligawa.  These have a hierarchy of officials and temple functionaries to perform the services and rituals.

Other tooth relics
Aside from the relic in Sri Lanka, several relics in other countries are also reputed to be a tooth-relic of the Buddha.
 Lingguang Temple of the Badachu Park in Beijing, China.
 Buddha Memorial Center of the Fo Guang Shan Monastery in Kaohsiung, Taiwan.
 Engaku Temple in Kamakura, Japan.
Somawathiya Chaitya
 Buddha Tooth Relic Temple and Museum in Chinatown, Singapore.
 Lu Mountain Temple in Rosemead, California
 Nagarjunakonda, museum on the island situated in the Nagarjunasagar Lake.
 Baoxiang temple, buddhist temple and monastery in Wenshang county, Jining city, Shandong province, China

See also 
 Cetiya
 Relics associated with Buddha#Relics in Sri Lanka
 Relics of Sariputta and Moggallana
 Śarīra
 Refuge in Buddhism
 Dathavamsa
 Diyawadana Nilame
 Kandy Esala Perahera
 Bayinnaung Kyawhtin Nawrahta
 Chinese expeditions to the Sinhala Kingdom
 Velakkara revolt
 Goa Inquisition

References

Buddha
Buddhism in Sri Lanka
Buddhist pilgrimage sites in Sri Lanka
Tooth
Gautama Buddha
Theravada
Tourist attractions in Central Province, Sri Lanka
Teeth